Myofascial trigger points (MTrPs), also known as trigger points, are described as hyperirritable spots in the skeletal muscle. They are associated with palpable nodules in taut bands of muscle fibers. They are a topic of ongoing controversy, as there is limited data to inform a scientific understanding of the phenomenon.  Accordingly, a formal acceptance of myofascial "knots" as an identifiable source of pain is more common among bodyworkers, physical therapists, chiropractors, and osteopathic practitioners.  Nonetheless, the concept of trigger points provides a framework which may be used to help address certain musculoskeletal pain.

The trigger point model states that unexplained pain frequently radiates from these points of local tenderness to broader areas, sometimes distant from the trigger point itself.  Practitioners claim to have identified reliable referred pain patterns which associate pain in one location with trigger points elsewhere.  There is variation in the methodology for diagnosis of trigger points and a dearth of theory to explain how they arise and why they produce specific patterns of referred pain.

Compression of a trigger point may elicit local tenderness, referred pain, or local twitch response. The local twitch response is not the same as a muscle spasm. This is because a muscle spasm refers to the entire muscle contracting whereas the local twitch response also refers to the entire muscle but only involves a small twitch, no contraction.

Among physicians, various specialists might use trigger point therapy. These include physiatrists (physicians specializing in physical medicine and rehabilitation), family medicine, and orthopedics.  Osteopathic as well as chiropractic schools also include trigger points in their training.   Other health professionals, such as athletic trainers, occupational therapists, physiotherapists, acupuncturists, massage therapists and structural integrators are also aware of these ideas and many of them make use of trigger points in their clinical work as well.

Signs and symptoms 
The term "trigger point" was coined in 1942 by Dr. Janet Travell to describe a clinical finding with the following characteristics:
 Pain related to a discrete, irritable point in skeletal muscle or fascia, not caused by acute local trauma, inflammation, degeneration, neoplasm or infection.
 The painful point can be felt as a nodule or band in the muscle, and a twitch response can be elicited on stimulation of the trigger point.
 Palpation of the trigger point reproduces the patient's complaint of pain, and the pain radiates in a distribution of the muscle and/or nerve. Patients can have a trigger point in their upper trapezius and when compressed feel pain in their forearm, hand and fingers (S. Goldfinch)

Pathophysiology 
Activation of trigger points may be caused by a number of factors, including acute or chronic muscle overload, activation by other trigger points (key/satellite, primary/secondary), disease, psychological distress (via systemic inflammation), homeostatic imbalances, direct trauma to the region, collision trauma (such as a car crash which stresses many muscles and causes instant trigger points), radiculopathy, infections and health issues such as smoking.

Trigger points form only in muscles.  They form as a local contraction in a small number of muscle fibers in a larger muscle or muscle bundle.  These in turn can pull on tendons and ligaments associated with the muscle and can cause pain deep within a joint where there are no muscles. The integrated hypothesis theory states that trigger points form from excessive release of acetylcholine which produces sustained depolarization of muscle fibers. Indeed, the trigger point has an abnormal biochemical composition with elevated concentrations of acetylcholine, noradrenaline and serotonin and a lower pH. These sustained contractions of muscle sarcomeres compresses local blood supply restricting the energy needs of the local region.  This crisis of energy produces sensitizing substances that interact with some nociceptive (pain) nerves traversing in the local region which in turn can produce localized pain within the muscle at the neuromuscular junction (Travell and Simons 1999).
When trigger points are present in muscles there is often pain and weakness in the associated structures. These pain patterns in muscles follow specific nerve pathways and have been readily mapped to allow for identification of the causative pain factor. Many trigger points have pain patterns that overlap, and some create reciprocal cyclic relationships that need to be treated extensively to remove them.

Diagnosis 
Practitioners do not agree on what constitutes a trigger point, but the assessment typically considers symptoms, pain patterns and manual palpation.  Usually there is a taut band in muscles containing trigger points, and a hard nodule can be felt. Often a twitch response can be felt in the muscle by running your finger perpendicular to the muscle's direction; this twitch response often activates the "all or nothing" response in a muscle that causes it to contract. Pressing on an affected muscle can often refer pain. Clusters of trigger points are not uncommon in some of the larger muscles, such as the gluteus group (gluteus maximus, gluteus medius, and gluteus minimus). Often there is a heat differential in the local area of a trigger point.

A 2007 review of diagnostic criteria used in studies of trigger points concluded that
 "there is as yet limited consensus on case definition in respect of MTrP pain syndrome. Further research is needed to test the reliability and validity of diagnostic criteria. Until reliable diagnostic criteria have been established, there is a need for greater transparency in research papers on how a case of MTrP pain syndrome is defined, and claims for effective interventions in treating the condition should be viewed with caution."
A 2009 review of nine studies examining the reliability of trigger point diagnosis found that physical examination could not be recommended as reliable for the diagnosis of trigger points.

Imaging 
Since the early 2000s several research studies have been conducted to determine if there was a way to visualize myofascial trigger points using tools such as ultrasound imaging and magnetic resonance elastography. Several of these studies have been dismissed under meta-analysis. Another synthetic literature review expressed more optimism about the validity of imaging for myofascial trigger points, but admitted small sample sizes of the reviewed studies.

Myofascial pain syndrome 
Myofascial pain syndrome is a focal hyperirritability in muscle that can strongly modulate central nervous system functions.  Scholars distinguish this from fibromyalgia, which is characterized by widespread pain and tenderness and is described as a central augmentation of nociception giving rise to deep tissue tenderness that includes muscles.
Myofascial pain is associated with muscle tenderness that arises from trigger points, focal points of tenderness, a few millimeters in diameter, found at multiple sites in a muscle and the fascia of muscle tissue. Biopsy tests found that trigger points were hyperirritable and electrically active muscle spindles in general muscle tissue.

Misdiagnosis of pain 
The misdiagnosis of pain is the most important issue taken up by Travell and Simons. Referred pain from trigger points mimics the symptoms of a very long list of common maladies, but physicians, in weighing all the possible causes for a given condition, rarely consider a myofascial source. The study of trigger points has not historically been part of medical education. Travell and Simons hold that most of the common everyday pain is caused by myofascial trigger points and that ignorance of that basic concept could inevitably lead to false diagnoses and the ultimate failure to deal effectively with pain.

Treatment

Physical muscle treatment
Therapists may use myotherapy (deep pressure as in Bonnie Prudden's approach, massage or tapotement as in Dr. Griner's approach), mechanical vibration, pulsed ultrasound, electrostimulation, ischemic compression, trigger-point-injection (see below), dry-needling, "spray-and-stretch" using a cooling spray (vapocoolant), low-level laser therapy and stretching techniques that invoke reciprocal inhibition within the musculoskeletal system. Practitioners may use elbows, feet or various tools to direct pressure directly upon the trigger point, to avoid overuse of their hands.

A successful treatment protocol relies on identifying trigger points, resolving them and, if all trigger points have been deactivated, elongating the structures affected along their natural range of motion and length. In the case of muscles, which is where most treatment occurs, this involves stretching the muscle using combinations of passive, active, active isolated (AIS), muscle energy techniques (MET), and proprioceptive neuromuscular facilitation (PNF) stretching to be effective. Fascia surrounding muscles should also be treated to elongate and resolve strain patterns, otherwise muscles will simply be returned to positions where trigger points are likely to re-develop.

The results of manual therapy are related to the skill level of the therapist. If trigger points are pressed too short a time, they may activate or remain active; if pressed too long or hard, they may be irritated or the muscle may be bruised, resulting in pain in the area treated. This bruising may last for a 1–3 days after treatment, and may feel like, but is not similar to, delayed onset muscle soreness (DOMS), the pain felt days after overexerting muscles. Pain is also common after a massage if the practitioner uses pressure on unnoticed latent or active trigger points, or is not skilled in myofascial trigger point therapy.

Physical exercise aimed at controlling posture, stretching, and proprioception have all been studied with no conclusive results. However, exercise proved beneficial to help reduce pain and severity of symptoms that one felt. Muscular contractions that occur during exercise favor blood flow to areas that may be experiencing less than normal flow. This also causes a localized stretching effect on the fascia and may help relieve the abnormally tight fascia. Evidence that supports these exercises for a treatment is scarce, but physical exercise can be beneficial in reducing the intensity of pain.

Researchers of evidence-based medicine concluded as of 2001 that evidence for the usefulness of trigger points in the diagnosis of fibromyalgia is thin. More recently, an association has been made between fibromyalgia tender points and active trigger points.

Trigger point injection
Injections without anesthetics, or dry needling, and injections including saline, local anesthetics such as procaine hydrochloride (Novocain) or articaine without vasoconstrictors like epinephrine, steroids, and botulinum toxin provide more immediate relief and can be effective when other methods fail. In regards to injections with anesthetics, a low concentration, short acting local anesthetic such as procaine 0.5% without steroids or epinephrine is recommended. High concentrations or long acting local anesthetics as well as epinephrine can cause muscle necrosis, while use of steroids can cause tissue damage.

Despite the concerns about long acting agents, a mixture of lidocaine and marcaine is often used. A mixture of 1 part 2% lidocaine with 3 parts 0.5% bupivacaine (trade name:Marcaine) provides 0.5% lidocaine and 0.375% bupivacaine. This has the advantages of immediate anesthesia with lidocaine during injection to minimize injection pain while providing a longer duration of action with a lowered concentration of bupivacaine.

In 1979, a study by Czech physician Karl Lewit reported that dry needling had the same success rate as anesthetic injections for the treatment of trigger points. He dubbed this the 'needle effect'.

In the 1950s and 1960s, studies relevant to trigger points were done by Jonas Kellgren at University College Hospital, London, in the 1930s and, independently, by Michael Gutstein in Berlin and Michael Kelly in Australia.

Health insurance companies in the US such as Blue Cross, Medica, and HealthPartners began covering trigger point injections in 2005.

Risks
Treatment, whether by self or by a professional, has some inherent dangers.  It may lead to damage of soft tissue and other organs. The trigger points in the upper quadratus lumborum, for instance, are very close to the kidneys and poorly administered treatment (particularly injections) may lead to kidney damage. Likewise, treating the masseter muscle may damage the salivary glands superficial to this muscle. Furthermore, some experts believe trigger points may develop as a protective measure against unstable joints.

Efficacy

Studies have shown a moderate level of evidence for manual therapy for short-term relief in the treatment of myofascial trigger points. Dry needling and dry cupping have not shown evidence of efficacy greater than a placebo.  There have not been enough in-depth studies to be conclusive about the latter treatment modalities, however.
  
Studies to date on the efficacy of dry needling for MTrPs and pain have been too small to be conclusive.

Overlap with acupuncture 
In a June 2000 review, Chang-Zern Hong correlates the MTrP "tender points" to acupunctural "ah shi" ("Oh Yes!") points, and the "local twitch response" to acupuncture's "de qi" ("needle sensation"), based on a 1977 paper by Melzack et al. Peter Dorsher comments on a strong correlation between the locations of trigger points and classical acupuncture points, finding that 92% of the 255 trigger points correspond to acupuncture points, including 79.5% with similar pain indications.

History
In the 19th century, British physician George William Balfour, German anatomist Robert Froriep, and the German physician  Strauss described pressure-sensitive, painful knots in muscles, sometimes called myofascial trigger points through retrospective diagnosis.

The concept was popularized in the US in the middle of the 20th century by the American physician Janet G. Travell.

Controversy
A review from 2015 in the journal Rheumatology, official journal of the British Society for Rheumatology, came to the conclusion that the concept of myofascial pain caused by trigger points was nothing but an invention without any scientific basis. A rejection of this criticism appeared in the Journal of Bodywork & Movement Therapies, the official journal of several therapeutic societies, including The National Association of Myofascial Trigger Point Therapists USA.

See also
 Pressure point
 Myofascial pain syndrome
 Myofascial release
 Neuromuscular therapy
 Acupressure

References

External links 

Injuries
Massage therapy
Pain management
Soft tissue disorders
1940s neologisms
Pseudoscience